European Newspaper Award is a design competition for European newspapers. The competition was founded and is organized by newspaper
designer Norbert Küpper from Meerbusch, Germany. He co-operates with the journalist magazines Medium Magazin (Frankfurt), Der Österreichische Journalist (Salzburg), and Schweizer Journalist (Oberuzwil). The first winners were announced in 1999.

In 2013 there were 20 different award categories and the winners would be announced around 15 November.

List of all winners of the title "European Newspaper of year"

1. European Newspaper Award (1999)

    Local newspaper: Firda, Norway
    Regional newspaper: Dagblad de Limburger, The Netherlands
    Nationwide newspaper: Die Welt, Germany
    Weekly newspaper: no award

2. European Newspaper Award (2000)

    Local newspaper: Laagendalsposten, Norway
    Regional newspaper: El Correo, Spain
    Nationwide newspaper: The Guardian, Great Britain
    Weekly newspaper: Die Woche, Germany

3. European Newspaper Award (2001)

    Local newspaper: no award
    Regional newspaper: no award
    Nationwide newspaper: Diário de Noticias, Spain
    Nationwide newspaper: Trouw, The Netherlands
    Weekly newspaper: Independent on Sunday, Great Britain

4. European Newspaper Award (2002)

    Local newspaper: Tønsbergs Blad, Norway
    Regional newspaper: Bergens Tidende, Norway
    Nationwide newspaper: Ta Nea, Greece
    Weekly newspaper: Frankfurter Allgemeine Sonntagszeitung, Germany

5. European Newspaper Award (2003)

    Local newspaper: Goienkaria, Spain
    Regional newspaper: Heraldo de Aragón, Spain
    Nationwide newspaper: Corriere della Sera, Italy
    Weekly newspaper: Sunday Tribune, Ireland
    Judges' Special Recognition: La Voz de Galicia, Spain

6. European Newspaper Award (2004)

    Local newspaper: Diario de Noticias, Spain
    Regional newspaper: Het Parool, The Netherlands
    Nationwide newspaper: De Morgen, Belgium
    Weekly newspaper: Sentinel Sunday, Great Britain
    Weekly newspaper: Bergens Tidende, Norway

7. European Newspaper Award (2005)
    Local newspaper: Östersunds-Posten, Sweden
    Regional newspaper: Kleine Zeitung, Austria
    Nationwide newspaper: The Guardian, Great Britain
    Weekly newspaper: Die Zeit, Germany
    Weekly newspaper: Presso, Finland

8. European Newspaper Award (2006)
    Local newspaper: Hufvudstadsbladet, Finland
    Regional newspaper: Bergens Tidende, Norway
    Nationwide newspaper: De Morgen, Belgium
    Weekly newspaper: Expresso, Portugal
    Judges' Special Recognition: Superdeporte, Spain

9. European Newspaper Award (2007)

    Local newspaper: The Mayo News, Ireland
    Regional newspaper: el Periódico de Catalunya, Spain
    Nationwide newspaper: Eleftheros Tipos, Greece
    Weekly newspaper: Welt am Sonntag, Germany

10. European Newspaper Award (2008)

    Local newspaper: Diári de Balears, Spain
    Regional newspaper: Basler Zeitung, Switzerland
    Nationwide newspaper: Svenska Dagbladet, Sweden
    Weekly newspaper: Athens Plus, Greece
    Judges' Special Recognition: nrc next, The Netherlands

11. European Newspaper Award (2009)

    Local newspaper: Smålandsposten, Sweden
    Regional newspaper: Stuttgarter Zeitung, Germany
    Nationwide newspaper: i, Portugal
    Judges' Special Recognition: 24 sata, Croatia

12. European Newspaper Award (2010)

    Local newspaper: Diário de Notícias da Madeira, Portugal
    Regional newspaper: Bergens Tidende, Norway
    Nationwide newspaper: Politiken, Danmark
    Weekly newspaper: Sunday Herald, Scotland
    Judges' Special Recognition: Gealscéal, Ireland
    Judges' Special Recognition: Frankfurter Rundschau iPad, Germany

12+1. European Newspaper Award (2011)

    Local newspaper: Hordaland, Norway
    Regional newspaper: Berliner Morgenpost, Germany
    Nationwide newspaper: Berlingske, Danmark
    Weekly newspaper: NZZ am Sonntag, Switzerland

14. European Newspaper Award (2012)

    Local newspaper: Bygdanytt, Norway
    Regional newspaper: El Correo, Spain
    Nationwide newspaper: De Tijd, Belgium
    Nationwide newspaper: Trouw, The Netherlands
    Weekly newspaper: Die Zeit, Germany
    Judges' Special Recognition: Welt am Sonntag Kompakt, Germany

15. European Newspaper Award (2013)

    Local newspaper: Hallingdølen, Norway
    Regional newspaper: Leeuwarder Courant, the Netherlands
    Nationwide newspaper: de Volkskrant, the Netherlands
    Weekly newspaper: Welt am Sonntag, Germany
    Judges' Special Recognition: Moskovskie Novosti, Russia
    Judges' Special Recognition: público.pt, Portugal

16. European Newspaper Award (2014)
    Local newspaper: The Mayo News, Ireland
    Regional newspaper: De Twentsche Courant Tubantia, the Netherlands
    Nationwide newspaper: Público, Portugal
    Weekly newspaper: Sonntagszeitung, Switzerland

17. European Newspaper Award (2015)
    Local newspaper: Kvinnheringen, Norway
    Regional newspaper: Ara, Spain
    Nationwide newspaper: De Morgen, Belgium
    Weekly newspaper: Expresso, Portugal
    Judges' Special Recognition: publico.pt, Portugal
    Judges' Special Recognition: Souriatna, Syria

18. European Newspaper Award (2016)
    Local newspaper: Hufvudstadsbladet, Finland
    Regional newspaper: Het Parool, the Netherlands
    Nationwide newspaper: Politiken, Denmark
    Weekly newspaper: Frankfurter Allgemeine Sonntagszeitung, Germany

19. European Newspaper Award (2017)
    Local newspaper: Tageblatt, Luxemburg
    Regional newspaper: De Limburger, the Netherlands
    Nationwide newspaper: Handelsblatt, Germany
    Weekly newspaper: Morgenbladet, Norway

20. European Newspaper Award (2018)
    Local newspaper: Sunnhordland, Norway
    Regional newspaper: Adresseavisen, Norway
    Nationwide newspaper: Het Financieele Dagblad, The Netherlands
    Weekly newspaper: der Freitag, Germany                                                                                    
    Judges' Special Recognition: Ara, Spain 
    Judges' Special Recognition: Berliner Morgenpost, Germany 
    Judges' Special Recognition: Politiken, Danmark 
    Judges' Special Recognition: Stuttgarter Zeitung, Germany

21. European Newspaper Award (2019)
    Local newspaper: Contacto, Luxembourg
    Regional newspaper: Ara, Spain
    Nationwide newspaper: De Tijd, The Netherlands
    Weekly newspaper: Expresso, Portugal                                                                                   
    Judges' Special Recognition: Fuldaer Zeitung, Germany

22. European Newspaper Award (2020)
    Local newspaper: Fædrelandsvennen, Norway
    Regional newspaper: Leeuwarder Courant, The Netherlands
    Nationwide newspaper: Público, Portugal
    Weekly newspaper: Financial Times – FT Weekend, United Kingdom                                                                                   
    Judges' Special Recognition: de Volkskrant, The Netherlands

23. European Newspaper Award (2021)
    Local newspaper: Hallingdølen, Norway
    Regional newspaper: Ara, Spain
    Nationwide newspaper: De Tijd, Belgium
    Weekly newspaper: Expresso, Portugal                                                                                  
    Judges' Special Recognition: de Volkskrant, The Netherlands
    Judges' Special Recognition: Hamburger Abendblatt, Germany

References

Design awards
Journalism awards
Newspaper events